George Andrew (24 November 1945 – 30 July 1993) was a Scottish footballer who played as a centre-back.

Career
Andrew began his career in the youth ranks at Scottish club Possilpark Juniors, before joining West Ham United in August 1963. Andrew had to wait nearly four years for his first team debut, deputising in a defence without West Ham stalwarts Bobby Moore and Ken Brown, in a 2–2 draw against Sunderland on 11 February 1967. Andrew made one final appearance for the club, a fortnight later in a 4–0 loss away to Everton. In July 1967, Andrew signed for Crystal Palace. Andrew stayed at the club for a year, failing to make a first team appearance. In 1968, Andrew dropped down into Non-League football, playing for Romford. Following his retirement, Andrew went into teaching and osteopathy.

References

1945 births
1993 deaths
Association football defenders
Scottish footballers
Footballers from Glasgow
West Ham United F.C. players
Crystal Palace F.C. players
Romford F.C. players
English Football League players
Scottish educators
Osteopaths